Nana Appiah Mensah (May 16, 1984) popularly known as NAM1, is a Ghanaian businessman known for the Menzgold, gold dealership and investment firm that promised customers a 10 percent monthly returns on their investments. NAM1 is also the chief executive officer of Zylofon Media which has signed Ghanaian musicians such as Shatta Wale, Stonebwoy., Becca, Joyce Blessing, and Kumi Guitar, and movie stars such as Benedicta Gafah, and Toosweet Annan.

Education 
Mensah is an alumnus of Adisadel College . He then furthered to the University of Ghana thus Legon for his first degree. At the university, he studied degree programmes, including Economics & Business Management, Finance, Mining and Environmental Studies, Psychology, Law, African and World History and Theology.

Life and career
On 9 January 2019, a circuit court issued a warrant to arrest Mensah for money laundering and fraud causing the Criminal Investigations Department of the Ghana Police Service to trigger an Interpol red alert. In September 2018, Menzgold took Securities and Exchange Commission,Ghana (SEC) and the Bank of Ghana (BOG) to court after its license was revoked by SEC. Mensah is expected to return to Ghana after his arrest in December, 2018 for alleged botched gold business and stands trial in Dubai to assist authorities payback all customers of MenzGold.

There has been a pronounced judgment by the court in Dubai to acquit and discharge him on the alleged fraud deal to pay him all outstanding debt. 15 April 2019 has been set aside as redemption day for clients of the company. According to a Ghanaian British citizen, Stanley Kodia, the government of Ghana is using inappropriate means to detain Mensah in Dubai. He stated that according to his French lawyer who has made inquiries from Interpol Headquarters in France, a suspect is supposed to stay in the custody of Interpol for only 60days and released if not guilty of any charge.

It was reported that, he is to be paid by order of Dubai court a sum of $39 million as payment of the Gold he supplied to Royal Diamonds in three weeks. The company is to pay an addition to pay a compensation for wrongful incarceration. He arrived in Ghana on 11 July to be interrogated by the Criminal Investigation Department of Ghana Police Service. Provisionally he has been charged with money laundering, unlicensed to take deposits and defrauding by false pretense.

Achievements 
 2 Awards for his contribution and Excellence in Business Development.- Blackstar line Cooperative Credit Union, in conjunction with the Marcus Garvey Foundation presented two award plaques to NAM 1 for his contribution to Business Development with his list of entities.
 
 Donates GHc 20,000 to Ghana U17 and U20 
 Special Recognition Award for Business Innovation at the Exclusive Men Of The Year Africa Awards 2017.
 4syte Music Video Awards 2017 - Lifetime Achievement Award.
 Business Category - 50 Most Influential Young Ghanaians.
 Special Award - 2018 Radio and Television Personality (RTP) Awards before popping up second on a list of the Most Influential Entertainment Personality in Ghana for 2018 behind the chief executive officer of EiB Network, Kwabena Adisi known as ‘Bola Ray’.
 100 Most Influential Young Persons in Africa by the Confederation of West African Youth (CWAY) in July 2018.
 8th Ghana Entrepreneur and Corporate Executive Awards in April 2018 - Best Business Executive of the Year.
 November 2018 - Special Award at the Ghana Music Awards South Africa.
 2nd Most Influential Entertainment Personality in Ghana for 2018.
 Acquiring lower-tier Star Madrid FC, NAM 1 through one of his companies Zylofon Cash signing a five-year deal worth $10 million to become the headline sponsors of the Ghana Premier League in May 2018.
 Special Recognition Award for Business Innovation at the Exclusive Men Of The Year Africa Awards (EMY AFRICA) in June 2017.

References 

Living people
University of Ghana alumni
Year of birth uncertain
Year of birth missing (living people)